30 Stockton is a trolleybus line operated by the San Francisco Municipal Railway. The line is notable for being the slowest trolleybus route in the city of San Francisco because it travels through the densely populated neighborhood of Chinatown.

Route description

Daytime buses operate between Townsend and 4th and Sports Basement in Crissy Field. Evening trips terminate outbound at Divisadero and Chestnut. A short turn service operates a slightly modified route between Van Ness Avenue at North Point in the north and Townsend at 5th in the south. It operates primarily on its namesake Stockton Street as well as Columbus Avenue, Chestnut Street, Third Street, Fourth Street, and Fifth Street with short segments on Van Ness Avenue, Divisadero Street, and Broderick. Trips beyond Divisadero and Chestnut operate in battery mode due to lack of overhead wire on the outbound side of the line.

30X Marina Express
Express rush-hour service operates between the Marina District and the Financial District, without stopping through most of Russian Hill. From Chestnut Street, inbound (morning) buses run on Van Ness, North Point, and Columbus, not starting local service until Jackson and Columbus. It continues inbound on Montgomery, Clay, Sansome, California, Davis, Beale, and Howard to the Embarcadero. Outbound (evening) buses originate further west at Spear and Howard and run on Howard, Main, Market, Pine, and Sansome where it continues express on Broadway, and Van Ness before beginning to stop on Chestnut. The line was suspended in 2020 amid the COVID-19 pandemic.

History

F Stockton streetcar
The F Stockton was a streetcar route that ran from Market and Stockton to the Marina District via Stockton, Columbus, North Point, Van Ness, and Chestnut to Laguna. This was one of four routes planned as a result of the 1915 Panama–Pacific International Exposition. The Stockton Street Tunnel, opened in 1914, was built primarily for these streetcars. In 1916, the line was extended from Chestnut and Laguna to Chestnut and Scott. It was further extended in 1947 from Market and Stockton down 4th Street to the Southern Pacific terminal on Townsend.

Trolleybus operation

Streetcar route F was replaced by trolleybus service on January 20, 1951, and was re-designated as route 30. (The F designation was later reused for the unrelated F Market & Wharves historic streetcar route in 1995.)

Wires on Harrison and 5th Streets were installed in 2002 to provide a diversion for construction in the area. Between 2012 and 2019 the line was detoured around 4th Street to allow for construction of the Central Subway. The route was extended at its outer, northern end by almost one mile (around 1.5 km) to Crissy Field on September 19, 2020. The overhead trolley wires were not extended, and the trolleybuses operate over the new section solely using battery power, a feature that is sufficiently powerful in the fleet's newest vehicles that they can do so on a regular basis (over short distances).

References

External links

30 Stockton — via San Francisco Municipal Transportation Agency

San Francisco Municipal Railway trolleybus routes
Railway lines closed in 1951
1951 establishments in California